Medford School District (549C) is a school district in the U.S. state of Oregon. It is the largest school district of southern Oregon. The district is bordered directly to the north by the Central Point School District and on the south by the Phoenix-Talent School District. (Other nearby districts include the Ashland School District, Grants Pass School District, and Klamath Falls City School District).  Today, district 549C encompasses 14 primary schools, two secondary schools, and three high schools in three cities: Medford, Jacksonville, and Ruch.  As of 2018, district enrollment stood at 13,981 students.

The Medford School District passed a school bond in November 2006 that collected $189 million to completely rebuild South Medford High School and Lone Pine Elementary School. Some remodeling was done to North Medford High School. All schools received a part of the bond money for repairs and renovations. Wednesday, September 9, 2010 marked the first full day of class for all students at the new South Medford High School on Cunningham Avenue. The same day marked the re-opening of the remodeled North Medford High School for all students.

Administration

Superintendent and cabinet
Dr. Bret Champion, Superintendent
Michelle Cummings, Chief Academic Officer
Jeanne Grazioli, Director of Elementary Education
To Be Determined, Director of Secondary Education

School board members
Cynthia Wright, Board Chair
Jeff Kinsella, Board Vice Chair
Lilia Caballero, School Board Member
Jim Horner, School Board Member
Tod Hunt, School Board Member
Suzanne Messer, School Board Member
Karen Startchvick, School Board Member

Demographics
In the 2017-2019 school year, district student demographics were as follows: 

 American Indian/Alaska Native: 1%
 Asian: 1%
 Black/African America: 1%
 Hispanic/Latino: 26%
 Multiracial: 5%
 Native Hawaiian/Pacific Islander: 1%
 White: 66%

 Ever English Learner: 14%
 Students with Disabilities: 15%
 Free/Reduced Lunch: 67%
 Required Vaccinations: 91%
 Languages Spoken: 38

Primary schools
Abraham Lincoln Elementary School (Enrollment: 535 students as of 2010)
Griffin Creek Elementary School (580)
Hoover Elementary School (639)
Howard Elementary School (545)
Jackson Elementary School
Jacksonville Elementary School (390)
Jefferson Elementary School (479)
Kennedy Elementary School (530)
Lone Pine Elementary School (540)
Oak Grove Elementary School (500)
Roosevelt Elementary School (428)
Ruch Elementary School (210)
Washington Elementary School (425)
Wilson Elementary School (492)

Secondary schools
Medford's secondary schools offer education services to students of grade level 6 or 7 to 12.

Hedrick Middle School

Hedrick Middle School, built in 1955, is one of the two middle schools located in Medford. The grade levels taught at Hedrick are 6th, 7th, and 8th.

During the 2007-2008, 2008–2009, and the first half of the 2009-2010 school years, Hedrick was occupied by the intermediate (4th-6th) grade levels from Roosevelt Elementary School while Roosevelt was being rebuilt due to the 2006 bond measure. Roosevelt Elementary School re-opened in January 2010, leaving the Hedrick Campus for the remainder of the year.

Since construction, Hedrick Middle School has undergone major renovations. Most notably between 1996 and 1998, the school was extensively remodeled with new air conditioning systems, many new classrooms, and a new cafeteria and office. As of October 1, 2007, the school has 955 Hedrick students and 73 staff members.

The following primary schools feed into Hedrick Middle School:
Abraham Lincoln Elementary - 5.1 km (3.2 mi)
Hoover Elementary - 2.3 km (1.4 mi)
Kennedy Elementary - 4.3 km (2.7 mi)
Lone Pine Elementary - 3.4 km (2.1 mi)
Roosevelt Elementary - 0.5 km (0.3 mi)
Wilson Elementary - 3.2 km (2.0 mi)

In 2001, Hedrick Middle School began a pilot program to expand grade level acceptance.  Under the program, both of Medford's middle schools will accept 6th grade students from elementary schools in their enrollment area.  The program was cancelled in 2004 due to school budget cuts.

McLoughlin Middle School

McLoughlin Middle School is the second of the two middle schools located in Medford. The grade levels taught at McLoughlin are 7th and 8th.

During the 2007-2008, 2008–2009, and the first half of the 2009-2010 school years, McLoughlin was occupied by the intermediate (4th-6th) grade levels from Jackson Elementary School while Jackson was also being rebuilt. Jackson Elementary School re-opened in January 2010, leaving McLoughlin.

As of  2009, the school has 900 students and 95 staff members.

The following elementary schools feed into McLoughlin Middle School:
Griffin Creek
Howard
Jackson
Jacksonville
Jefferson
Oak Grove
Ruch
Washington

High schools
Medford's high schools all offer grades 9-12.

Central Medford High School
North Medford High School
South Medford High School

Charter Schools 

 The Medford School District sponsors four public charter schools. Each one of these schools is governed by a charter board, which operates independently from the publicly-elected Medford School Board. When an initial charter proposal is accepted by the Medford School Board, a contract is developed to ensure the charter school maintains its proposed purpose and complies with all state laws. While charter schools operate independently of the Medford School District and the academic achievement of their enrolled students are tracked separately by the State of Oregon, the results are included among the results for all Medford public school students.
 Madrone Trail Public Charter School is a Waldorf-inspired charter school offering a full academic program. Integrating music, art, and movement in the teaching of all the core subjects makes learning come alive.  In addition, Special Subject teachers provide classes in foreign language, music, handwork, games, and woodwork as a regular part of the daily and weekly rhythm. The Waldorf approach seeks a balance between academic excellence, healthy emotional development, and strength of will or a balance between Head, Heart and Hands.
 Logos Public Charter School was chartered in 2010. The charter was renewed in 2013 for three years and then again in 2016 for 5 years. The school provides academic support for individualized learning and promotes dynamic parent involvement in each student’s education. The school has demonstrated success in connecting formerly homeschooling families with public school resources. 
 Kids Unlimited Academy was chartered in 2013 as an outgrowth of the mission of Kids Unlimited of Oregon to provide underserved students with empowerment opportunities. The school was founded to break down barriers for students by providing more instructional time, enrichment programs, and a high expectations, no excuses environment to ensure that high school graduation, college success, and career readiness are reasonable goals for all students regardless of race, gender, economic status, or zip code. Kids Unlimited Academy focuses on using best practice curricula, a broad variety of enrichment opportunities, and leveraging wrap around supports and strong parent engagement to ensure students receive a high quality holistic educational experience.  
 Valley Charter School was chartered in 2015. The Valley School strives to create a middle school where 6th-8th grade students are inspired, challenged, engaged and supported as they are provided a rigorous, STEM focused curriculum taught in a Montessori-based classroom environment.

See also
Spiegelberg Stadium
Central Point School District

References

External links
Medford School District (official website)

School districts in Oregon
Education in Medford, Oregon
Education in Jackson County, Oregon